Mikhail Mikhailovich Polischuk (born 10 January 1989) is a Russian freestyle swimmer. He was part of the Russian 4 × 200 m freestyle relay teams that finished in second and tenth place at the 2008 and 2012 Olympics, respectively.

References

1989 births
Living people
Russian male swimmers
Olympic swimmers of Russia
Olympic silver medalists for Russia
Swimmers at the 2008 Summer Olympics
Swimmers at the 2012 Summer Olympics
Swimmers from Moscow
Russian male freestyle swimmers
World Aquatics Championships medalists in swimming
Medalists at the 2008 Summer Olympics
Olympic silver medalists in swimming
Universiade medalists in swimming
Universiade gold medalists for Russia
Universiade bronze medalists for Russia
Medalists at the 2015 Summer Universiade